Namibia competed at the 2004 Summer Olympics in Athens, Greece, from 13 to 29 August 2004. This was the nation's fourth consecutive appearance at the Olympics.

Namibian National Olympic Committee sent a total of eight athletes to the Games, seven men and one woman, to compete in 5 sports. Three of them had previously competed in Sydney, including pistol shooter Friedhelm Sack and mountain biker Mannie Heymans. Sprinter and four-time Olympic silver medalist Frankie Fredericks sought his official comeback to the Games after an eight-year absence with the hopes of adding another medal to his career hardware. Flyweight boxer Paulus Ambunda was appointed by the committee to become the nation's flag bearer in the opening ceremony.

Namibia, however, failed to win a single Olympic medal for the second consecutive time since the previous Games. Being a top favorite for the Namibian team, Fredericks fell short of claiming his third medal in the 200 metres, and thereby missed a chance to climb into the podium on his final Olympic appearance. On August 29, 2004, at the time of the closing ceremony, Fredericks was elected to the IOC Athletes' Commission, along with three other athletes.

Athletics

Namibian athletes have so far achieved qualifying standards in the following athletics events (up to a maximum of 3 athletes in each event at the 'A' Standard, and 1 at the 'B' Standard).

Key
 Note–Ranks given for track events are within the athlete's heat only
 Q = Qualified for the next round
 q = Qualified for the next round as a fastest loser or, in field events, by position without achieving the qualifying target
 NR = National record
 N/A = Round not applicable for the event
 Bye = Athlete not required to compete in round

Men

Women

Boxing

Namibia sent two boxers to Athens.  Both received a bye in the round of 32, both won their match in the round of 16, and both were defeated in the quarterfinals.

Cycling

Mountain biking

Shooting 

Namibian has qualified a single shooter.

Men

Wrestling 

Key
  - Victory by Fall.
  - Decision by Points - the loser with technical points.
  - Decision by Points - the loser without technical points.

Men's freestyle

See also
 Namibia at the 2004 Summer Paralympics

References

External links
Official Report of the XXVIII Olympiad

Nations at the 2004 Summer Olympics
2004
Summer Olympics